Séan McCann (born 22 May 1967) is a Canadian singer and musician (playing bodhran, shakers, tin whistle and guitar) who formerly played with Great Big Sea, a band he co-founded. He announced plans to stop touring with the group at the end of December 2013.

After exiting Great Big Sea, McCann publicly admitted a secret past in which he used alcohol to mask the pain of sexual abuse by a priest. His fifth solo album was titled There's a Place.

Early life
He was born to Anita and Edward McCann. His mother was born in Northern Bay and his father in Gull Island. When he was a child, his family moved to St. John's. He was raised Roman Catholic. He is married and has 2 sons. He now lives in Manotick, a suburb of Ottawa, Ontario.

Career
McCann has released 5 solo works (Lullabies for Bloodshot Eyes, Son of a Sailor, Help Your Self, You Know I Love You, and There's a Place).

In June 2016, McCann released the folk song "Proud (To Be a Canadian)" for free online in partnership with the Canadian Red Cross to benefit victims of the Fort McMurray wildfires. McCann told The Canadian Press that his feelings of despair over the disaster led him to write the lyrics. Once he was finished he contacted fellow musician Jeremy Fisher to help him in the studio.

In November 2017, McCann organized a benefit songwriter's circle at the Algonquin Commons Theatre in Ottawa with his friends Joel Plaskett, Sarah Harmer, and Jeremy Fisher to raise money to purchase guitars for veterans suffering with PTSD and other mental-health issues.

Albums
 Lullabies for the Bloodshot Eyes (2010)
 Son of a Sailor (2011)
 Help Your Self (2014)
 You Know I Love You  (2015)
 There's a Place (2017)

References

External links

1967 births
Living people
Bodhrán players
Canadian folk rock musicians
Canadian people of Irish descent
Great Big Sea members
Members of the Order of Canada
Memorial University of Newfoundland alumni
Musicians from Newfoundland and Labrador
People from Carbonear